Eagleheart may refer to:

 Eagleheart (song) by Stratovarius (2002)
 Eagleheart (TV series) (2011–14)

See also 
 Engleheart